The snake pipefish (Entelurus aequoreus) is a species of pipefish, from the family Syngnathidae, native to the northeastern Atlantic Ocean where they are generally found amongst algae close in to shore.  It is the largest species of pipefish recorded in European waters and has spread into arctic waters in the early 2000s.

Description
The snake pipefish has a very long, elongated and slender body which has a smooth skin and rounded cross-section and which is distinguished from other sympatric pipefishes by the near lack of bony rings. It has a long head, with a thin dark stripe in its sides, with a long, concave snout and a very small, protractile  mouth. The long based dorsal fin has 37-47 short rays while the caudal fin is minute and there are no pectoral fins or anal fins. They are pale brown or yellowish-green in colour with each of the 28-31 rings on the body marked out by pale blue rings with dark margins. The opening to the gills has been reduced to a pore in the membrane above the opercle and the gill membranes are fused to the body and the isthmus. The juveniles of less than 70 mm in length have membranous pectoral fins which disappear as they mature.

Distribution
The snake pipefish occurs in the north eastern Atlantic from Iceland and Norway to the Azores, into the Baltic Sea. In the early 2000s it expanded its range northwards as far as Svalbard and the Barents Sea. It is not found in the Mediterranean Sea.

Habitat and biology
Its colour and patterning provides good camouflage in such habitats. The colonisation of the Waddensee sand flats by the invasive Japanese seaweed Sargassum muticum has facilitated an increase of snake pipefish in that area.

They breed in mid summer when the males and females pair up. The adults feed on small crustaceans and larval fish which are caught by being sucked into the mouth. It was noted when the populations of this species increased in the 2000s that some species of sea bird began to feed on the pipefish but found them rather indigestible due to they bony structure. Among those auks and terns, tried to feed these pipefish to their young as their more normal diet of sand-eels, had declined. However, the pipefish have limited nutritional value compared to the oily-fleshed sand-eels and many chicks choked on their hard, rather indigestible bodies.

Etymology
The generic name Entelurus is derived from the Greek entelès which means "complete" and oura which means "tail" referring to the long tail which stretches out from the anus and his hardly differentiated from the body while the specific name is from the Latin aequoreus which means "marine".

References

External links
 

snake pipefish
Fish of the North Atlantic
Fish of the North Sea
Fauna of the British Isles
snake pipefish
snake pipefish